Alpuri is a village at an altitude of 100 meters from sea level in the Gagra District of Abkhazia, Georgia. It is roughly 2 kilometres from Gagra.

See also
 Gagra District

Notes

Literature 
 Georgian Soviet Encyclopedia, V. 1, p. 325, Tb., 1975.

References

Populated places in Gagra District